"What You Could've Won" is a song by English indie rock band Milburn and featured on their debut album, Well Well Well. Released on 30 October 2006, it was the third single released from the album and charted at #66 in the UK.

Track listing
CD
"What You Could Have Won" (radio edit)
"Fireworks"

7"
"What You Could've Won" (radio edit)
"Wicked Thing To Say"

7" Gatefold Sleeve 
"What You Could've Won" (radio edit)
"Mad Dogs & Englishmen"

2006 singles
Milburn (band) songs
Song recordings produced by Dave Eringa
2006 songs
Mercury Records singles